A horse opera, hoss opera, oat opera or oater is a Western movie or television series that is clichéd or formulaic, in the manner of a soap opera.

The term, which was originally coined by silent film-era Western star William S. Hart, is used variously to convey either disparagement or affection. The name "horse opera" was also derived in part from the musical sequences frequently featured in these films and TV series, which depicted a cowboy singing to his horse on-screen. The term "horse opera" is quite loosely defined; it does not specify a distinct sub-genre of the Western (as "space opera" does with regard to the science fiction genre).

References

External links 
 

Film and video terminology
Western (genre) staples and terminology